Roger Kwami Mambu Zinga (1943 – 22 February 2004) was a filmmaker in the Democratic Republic of the Congo (DRC).

Life and Career
Kwami Mambu Zinga studied film at the Institut des Arts de Diffusion (IAD) at Louvain-la-Neuve, Belgium, graduating in 1971.
The next year he was the author of the first Congolese film to win an award in an international festival. 
His Moseka won the prize for short film at FESPACO 1972. 
This movie shows the return of the native son to the DRC after studying in Belgium and adjusting to his new life back in Zaire.
He co-directed Tango ya ba Wendo (1993) with the Belgian documentary maker Mirko Popovitch.
This film documents the old and talented Congolese musician Wendo Kolossoy, considered to be the "father of Congolese music".

Libanga
For almost two decades Kwami tried to make Libanga, a feature film, but conditions in Zaire did not make this possible.
However, he directed several other films.

Death
At the time of his death he held the position of Director of Cinematography for television. He was also the President of the Congolese Association of Filmmakers and an active member of the Pan African Federation of Filmmakers (Fepaci), for which he was the Regional Secretary for Central Africa. 
He died on 22 February 2004 in Kinshasa.

References

1943 births
2004 deaths
Democratic Republic of the Congo film directors